A  is a special envelope in which money is given as a gift of celebration in Japan, especially at weddings or other auspicious occasions, such as a birth or celebrating a new home.

The envelopes are typically decorated with  cord, with the colour of the cord having significance for the occasion, or, in the case of a funeral, the religious denomination of the giver.

Amount given
The amount given in  differs according to the givers' relationship to the couple, their social status and the style of venue. In the case of friends or company colleagues, the amount given is usually between ¥20,000 and ¥30,000. In the case of close friends or those in a senior position at the bride or bridegroom's company, ¥30,000 to ¥50,000 is common, and in the case of relatives, ¥50,000 to ¥100,000 is not unusual.

For married couples that attend the wedding, ¥50,000 would be common, as opposed to unmarried couples, where each person would give a separate amount of roughly ¥30,000 each.

It is common to give amounts in which the leading digits form an odd number, such as ¥10,000 or ¥30,000, in order to symbolize the fact that the newly married couple cannot be divided. When the leading digit forms an even number, as in ¥20,000, the amount is usually given in an odd number of bills (e.g. 1 × ¥10,000 and 2 × ¥5,000). Likewise, multiples of 9 are avoided, as the pronunciation of this number -  - is identical to the word for "suffering".

See also
 Washi, Japanese paper, used to make   
 , decorative cords wrapped around   
 , a traditional Japanese New Year's gift
 , envelope for condolence money offered at Japanese funerals
 Origami
 Origata
 Noshi

Notes

References

Marriage and religion
Wedding gifts
Giving
Japanese culture
Marriage, unions and partnerships in Japan